Jonathan Wilhite (born February 23, 1984) is a former American football cornerback. He played college football at Auburn and was drafted by the New England Patriots in the fourth round of the 2008 NFL Draft.

Wilhite has also been a member of the Denver Broncos and Chicago Bears.

Early years
Wilhite attended Ouachita Parish High School in Monroe, Louisiana, where he played football as a running back and receiver. He was named to the All-Northeast Louisiana team and was a second-team All-District selection.

College career

Butler County CC

2004
In 2004, Wilhite attended Butler County Community College and posted 44 tackles, seven pass deflections and five interceptions. He earned Earned National Junior College All-American team and All-Conference first-team and he was rated as the best Junior college cornerback in the country. Wilhite was also named first-team All-Kansas Jayhawk Community College Conference.

Auburn

2005
As a sophomore in 2005, Wilhite played in 12 games and started the last seven games. He was second on the team with seven pass deflections, five of which came in the last seven games of the season. Wilhite also had 47 tackles which made him fifth on Auburn's defense. Against Alabama he had five tackles and two pass deflections, against Georgia he had three tackles and a pass deflection. In the Capital One Bowl against Wisconsin he had five tackles. His best performance of the year came against Kentucky where he had seven tackles and one interception and was named SEC Defensive players of the week.

2006
In 2006, as a junior he started in 10 games and had 24 tackles. Against Alabama he had six tackles and then three against Georgia. Wilhite had two tackles against Arkansas State and three against Ole Miss. In the Cotton Bowl Classic, he did not play after he suffered an injury against LSU.

2007
As a senior in 2007, Wilhite started in six games: two at cornerback and four at nickel back. He had 30 tackles, a sack and a fumble recovery along with two interceptions and two pass deflections. During his college years, Wilhite became the team jokester, often impersonating coaches and teammates with dead-on accuracy. Auburn's Director of High School and NFL relations said of Wilhite's impersonations,

Professional career

New England Patriots

Wilhite was drafted by the New England Patriots in the fourth round (129th overall) in the 2008 NFL Draft. On July 17 he signed a contract with New England. He made his NFL debut on September 7, against Kansas City and had a season high six tackles against St. Louis on October 26. His first career interception came off of JaMarcus Russell of the Oakland Raiders on December 14. After spending most of the season behind cornerback Deltha O'Neal, Wilhite replaced O'Neal as a starter for the final four weeks of the 2008 season.

Wilhite played in 14 games for the Patriots in 2009, starting eight. He recorded two interceptions, 45 tackles, and five passes defensed. In 2010, Wilhite played in the first nine games of the season for the Patriots, starting one, before missing four games with a hip injury. He was placed on injured reserve on December 15, with a hamstring injury. He finished the season with 20 tackles and two passes defensed.

On August 29, 2011, he was waived.

Denver Broncos
Wilhite signed with the Denver Broncos on September 4, 2011.

Chicago Bears
Wilhite signed with the Chicago Bears on April 5, 2012. However, he was waived on August 31.

Personal life
In 2011, during the lockout, Wilhite married Sheena Davis.

References

External links

Denver Broncos bio
New England Patriots bio
Auburn Tigers bio

1984 births
Living people
Sportspeople from Monroe, Louisiana
Players of American football from Louisiana
African-American players of American football
American football cornerbacks
Butler Grizzlies football players
Auburn Tigers football players
New England Patriots players
Denver Broncos players
Chicago Bears players
21st-century African-American sportspeople
20th-century African-American people